Denethor II, son of Ecthelion II, is a fictional character in J. R. R. Tolkien's novel The Lord of the Rings. He was the 26th ruling Steward of Gondor, committing suicide in the besieged city of Minas Tirith during the Battle of the Pelennor Fields. 

Denethor is depicted as embittered and despairing as the forces of Mordor close in on Gondor. Critics have noted the contrast between Denethor and both Théoden, the good king of Rohan, and Aragorn, the true king of Gondor. Others have likened Denethor to Shakespeare's King Lear, both rulers falling into a dangerous despair.

In Peter Jackson's film trilogy, Denethor was portrayed as greedy and self-indulgent, quite unlike Tolkien's powerful leader.

Fictional biography

In Tolkien's Middle-earth, Denethor was the first son and third child of Ecthelion II, a Steward of Gondor. He married Finduilas, daughter of Prince Adrahil of Dol Amroth. She gave birth to two sons, Boromir and Faramir, but died when they were ten and five years old, respectively. Denethor never remarried, and became grimmer and more silent than before. He was a man of great will, foresight, and strength, but also overconfident. Gandalf described him as "proud and subtle, a man of far greater lineage and power [than Théoden of Rohan], though he is not called a king." Gandalf further commented: 

Unlike Saruman, Denethor was too strong to be corrupted directly by Sauron. He began secretly using a palantír to probe Sauron's strength, incorrectly insisting he could control it. The effort aged him quickly, and the impression of Sauron's overwhelming force that he gained from the palantír  depressed him greatly, as Sauron biased what he saw. Boromir's death depressed Denethor further, and he became ever more grim. Nonetheless he continued to fight Sauron until the forces of Mordor arrived at the gates of Minas Tirith, at which point he lost all hope. In the published essay on the palantíri, Tolkien wrote:

As invasion became certain, Denethor ordered the warning beacons of Gondor to be lit, and summoned forces from Gondor's provinces and from Rohan, while the people of Minas Tirith were sent away to safety. Denethor ordered his son Faramir to take his men to defend the river crossing at Osgiliath and the great wall of the Rammas Echor. Faramir was wounded, apparently mortally; his body was carried back to the city.

Denethor, grief-struck by the apparent loss of his son, ordered his servants to burn him alive on a funeral pyre prepared for himself and Faramir in Rath Dínen. He broke the white rod of his office over his knee, casting the pieces into the flames. He laid himself down on the pyre and so died, clasping the palantír in his hands. Faramir was saved from the flames by Gandalf.

Analysis 

The Tolkien scholar Jane Chance contrasts Denethor both with another "Germanic king", Theoden, and with the "true king" of Gondor, Aragorn. In Chance's view, Theoden represents good, Denethor evil; she notes that their names are almost anagrams, and that where Theoden welcomes the hobbit Merry Brandybuck into his service with loving friendship, Denethor accepts Merry's friend Pippin Took with a harsh contract of fealty. Chance writes that Tolkien further sets both Theoden and Denethor against the "Christian lord" Aragorn. In her opinion, Denethor "fails as a father, a master, a steward, and a rational man," giving in to despair, whereas Aragorn is brave in battle and gentle with his people, and has the Christlike attribute of healing.

Denethor's madness and despair has been compared to that of Shakespeare's King Lear. Both men are first outraged when their children (Faramir and Cordelia, respectively) refuse to aid them, but then grieve upon their children's death – which is only perceived in the case of Faramir. According to Michael D. C. Drout, both Denethor and Lear "despair of God's mercy", something extremely dangerous in a leader who has to defend his realm.

Alex Davis, in the J.R.R. Tolkien Encyclopedia, writes that many critics have examined his fall and corrupted leadership, whereas Richard Purtill identifies Denethor's pride and egoism, a man who considers Gondor his property.

The medievalist Elizabeth Solopova comments that unlike Aragorn, Denethor is incapable of displaying what Tolkien in Beowulf: the Monsters and the Critics called "northern courage", namely, the spirit to carry on in the face of certain defeat and death.

Adaptations

Early versions

Denethor was voiced by William Conrad in Rankin/Bass's 1980 animated adaptation of The Return of the King, and by Peter Vaughan in BBC Radio's 1981 serialization.

Peter Jackson's films

Denethor is played by John Noble in Peter Jackson's film The Lord of the Rings: The Return of the King. The film portrays Denethor far more negatively than the novel. Tolkien calls Denethor

The Tolkien scholar Tom Shippey wrote that where Tolkien's Denethor is a cold ruler doing his best for his country, Jackson's is made to look greedy and self-indulgent; Shippey calls the scene where he gobbles a meal, while his son Faramir has been sent out in a hopeless fight, a "blatant [use] of cinematic suggestion".

Christianity Today wrote that the films "missed the moral and religious depths" of the book, such as when they turned "the awful subtlety and complexity of evil" into something trivially obvious. It gave as an instance the caricaturing of the powerful Steward of Gondor, Denethor as "a snarling and drooling oaf rather than a noble pessimist".

Daniel Timmons writes in the J.R.R. Tolkien Encyclopedia that Jackson characterizes Denethor and others in a way "far from Tolkien's text", but that the film version successfully "dramatizes the insidious temptation to evil", and that through "the falls of Saruman, Denethor, and Sauron, we see the bitter fruits of the lust for power and its corrupting influence."

References

Primary
This list identifies each item's location in Tolkien's writings.

Secondary

Sources

 
  
 

Literary characters introduced in 1955
Male characters in literature
Denethor II
The Lord of the Rings characters
Fictional nobility
Fictional regents
Fictional military strategists
Fictional suicides
Middle-earth Dúnedain

de:Figuren in Tolkiens Welt#Denethor
simple:Middle-earth characters#Denethor